Crepidochares is a genus of moths in the Eriocottidae family.

Species
 Crepidochares aridula Davis, 1990 (from Chile)
 Crepidochares austrina Davis, 1990 (from Chile)
 Crepidochares colombiae Davis, 1990 (from Colombia)
 Crepidochares neblinae Davis, 1990
 Crepidochares subtigrina Meyrick, 1922 (from Brazil)

References

Eriocottidae